Richard Beresford (12 August 1869 – 12 July 1941) was an English cricketer. He played seven first-class matches for Cambridge University Cricket Club between 1889 and 1891.

See also
 List of Cambridge University Cricket Club players

References

External links
 

1869 births
1941 deaths
English cricketers
Cambridge University cricketers
Sportspeople from Peterborough
Norfolk cricketers